Arif Morkaya (born 20 May 1989) is a Turkish professional footballer who plays as a midfielder for Iğdır FK.

Career
Morkaya spent his early career in the lower tiers of Turkish football, with long spells at Darıca Gençlerbirliği, and Altınordu where he was captain. He joined Ankaragücü in 2017 and helped them get promoted to the Süper Lig. Morkaya made his professional debut with Ankaragücü in a 3–1 Süper Lig loss to Galatasaray on 10 August 2018.

References

External links
 
 
 

1989 births
Living people
Footballers from Istanbul
Turkish footballers
Association football midfielders
Turkey youth international footballers
MKE Ankaragücü footballers
Darıca Gençlerbirliği footballers
Bakırköyspor footballers
İstanbulspor footballers
1461 Trabzon footballers
Fatih Karagümrük S.K. footballers
Boluspor footballers
Tuzlaspor players
Süper Lig players
TFF First League players
TFF Second League players